Agencia Boliviana de Información (ABI) is a government press agency based in Bolivia.

Based in La Paz, it provides information in Spanish.

External links
Official website

News agencies based in Bolivia
State media